David Phillip Vetter (September 21, 1971 – February 22, 1984) was an American boy who was a prominent sufferer of severe combined immunodeficiency (SCID), a hereditary disease which dramatically weakens the immune system. Individuals born with SCID are abnormally susceptible to infections, and exposure to typically innocuous pathogens can be fatal. Vetter was referred to as "David, the bubble boy" by the media, as a reference to the complex containment system used as part of the management of his SCID. Vetter's surname was not revealed to the general public until 10 years after his death in order to preserve his family's privacy.

In his first years of life he lived mostly at Texas Children's Hospital in Houston, Texas. As he grew older, he lived increasingly at home with his parents and older sister Katherine in Dobbin, Texas. He died in 1984, at the age of 12.

Family and birth

Vetter's parents were Carol Ann Vetter and David Joseph Vetter, Jr. Their first son, David Joseph Vetter III, was also born with SCID and died at seven months old. Physicians advised the Vetters that any future male children they might conceive would have a 50% chance of inheriting the disease. At the time, the only management available for children born with SCID was isolation in a sterile environment until a successful bone-marrow transplant could be performed. The Vetters, who had a daughter, decided to proceed with another pregnancy. Their third child, David Phillip Vetter, was born on September 21, 1971.

A special sterilized cocoon bed was prepared for Vetter at his birth. Immediately after being removed from his mother's uterus, Vetter entered the plastic germ-free environment that would be his home for most of his life. Vetter was baptized a Roman Catholic with sterilized holy water once he had entered the bubble. Initial plans to proceed with a bone-marrow transplant came to a halt after it was determined that the prospective donor, Vetter's sister Katherine, was not a match.

Life in the bubble

Water, air, food, diapers, and clothes were sterilized before they could enter the sterile chamber. Items were placed in a chamber filled with ethylene oxide gas for four hours at 60 degrees Celsius (140º F), then aerated for a period of one to seven days before being placed in the sterile chamber.

After he was placed in the sterile chamber, Vetter was touched only through special plastic gloves attached to the walls of the chamber, which was kept inflated by air compressors that were so loud that communication with David was difficult. His parents and medical team, which included Dr. John Montgomery, sought to provide him as normal a life as possible, including a formal education, and a television and playroom inside the sterile chamber. About three years after Vetter's birth, the treatment team built an additional sterile chamber in his parents' home in Conroe, Texas, and a transport chamber so that Vetter could spend periods of two to three weeks at home, with his sister and friends for company. A friend arranged for a special showing of Return of the Jedi at a local theater so that Vetter could attend the movie in his transport chamber.

When Vetter was four years old, he discovered that he could poke holes in his bubble using a butterfly syringe that was left inside the chamber by mistake. At this point, the treatment team explained to him what germs were and how they affected his condition. As he grew older, he became aware of the world outside his chamber and expressed an interest in participating in what he could see outside the windows of the hospital and via television.

In 1977, researchers from NASA used their experience with the fabrication of space suits to develop a special suit that would allow Vetter to get out of his bubble and walk in the outside world. The suit was connected to his bubble via an eight-foot (2.5 m) long cloth tube and although cumbersome, it allowed him to venture outside without serious risk of contamination. Vetter was initially resistant to the suit, and although he later became more comfortable wearing it, he used it only seven times. He outgrew the suit and never used the replacement one provided for him by NASA.

Death
Approximately $1.3 million was spent on Vetter's care, but scientific study failed to produce a true "cure" and no donor match was identified. Vetter later received a bone marrow transplant from his sister Katherine. While his body did not reject the transplant, he became ill with infectious mononucleosis after a few months. He died on February 22, 1984, from Burkitt lymphoma at age 12. The autopsy revealed that Katherine's bone marrow contained traces of a dormant virus, Epstein–Barr, which was undetectable in the pre-transplant screening.

He was buried at Conroe Memorial Park, Conroe, Montgomery County, Texas, on February 25, 1984, next to his older brother, David Joseph Vetter III.

Legacy
A Conroe ISD elementary school which opened in 1990 in The Woodlands in unincorporated Montgomery County, Texas, was named David Elementary after Vetter.

The Paul Simon song "The Boy in the Bubble" was inspired by Vetter's story.

Aftermath
Vetter's parents later divorced. His father became the mayor of Shenandoah, Texas. His mother married Kent Demaret, a magazine reporter who had written about her son. Vetter's psychologist, Mary Murphy, wrote a book about Vetter's case that was to be published in 1995; however, its initial publication was blocked by his parents and Baylor College of Medicine. The book was published in 2019 under the title Bursting the Bubble: The Tortured Life and Untimely Death of David Vetter.

See also

 Ted DeVita
 The Boy in the Plastic Bubble, a 1976 TV movie drama inspired by Vetter and DeVita starring John Travolta 
 Bubble Boy, 2001 comedy film inspired by the life of David Vetter

References

External links

Lecture on the medical ethics of Vetter's case by historian James H. Jones

1971 births
1984 deaths
People from Conroe, Texas
American people with disabilities
American children
Burials in Texas
Deaths from cancer in Texas
Deaths from non-Hodgkin lymphoma
Medical controversies in the United States
People from Montgomery County, Texas
Catholics from Texas
Child deaths